Alexander Pelepiock (January 11, 1900 – June 14, 1977) was a Canadian-born Mexican cinematographer known for working in over 200 films, most of them during the Golden Age of Mexican cinema. His most well-known works include The Other One (1946), Desired (1951), En La Palma de Tu Mano (1952), and Untouched (1955). Throughout his career, he was nominated fourteen times for an Ariel Award for Best Cinematography which he won twice for En La Palma de Tu Mano and Untouched. In 1973, Phillips was recognized with a Golden Ariel from the Mexican Academy of Cinematographic Arts and Sciences for his excellence and contributions to the Mexican film industry. He died on June 14, 1977, at the age of 76, due to CVST.

Early life
Phillips was born in Renfrew, Ontario. In his youth, his family moved to Russia, but he returned to Canada because of his dislike with the czarist government. He enlisted in the Canadian Army where he met Mary Pickford who introduced him to Hollywood since he expressed his interest in becoming an actor.

Hollywood
He auditioned with Fox and Paramount Pictures but was unable to obtain a role. And studied under Stanley Shoemakers wing. He later approached Christie Comedies where he was advised to look for more stable positions in the movie industry and started his career in cinematography and film editing. He received an opportunity when an assistant fell sick and was able to travel to France with the Canadian Official Photography. After Christie Comedies went bankrupt, he was hired by Samuel Goldwyn while he attended evening classes. He received the opportunity of working with Barnes, Edison and Meyer, and learned techniques such as graduations, tridimensional vision, and the sense of potential balance. Phillips then began experimenting with lights and camera movements.

Mexico
He moved to Mexico in 1931 and worked with directors such as Arcady Boytler, Roberto Gavaldón, Julio Bracho, and Luis Buñuel. He worked on some of the earliest Mexican movies such as the silent film Santa (1931) where his work was considered expressionist. He worked in more than 250 movies in Mexico and 150 in the United States including La mujer del puerto (1934), Aventuras de Robinson Crusoe (1952 with Luis Buñuel), La Red (1953 with Emilio Fernández). His last film was El castillo de la pureza (1972 with Arturo Ripstein).

Awards
Premio Ariel for En la palma de tu mano (1952), Untouched (1955), and El Castillo de la pureza (1973, Ariel de Oro).

Selected filmography
 See My Lawyer (1921)
 Hold Your Breath (1924)
 Seven Days (1925)
 The Nervous Wreck (1926)
 Luponini from Chicago (1935)
 The Eternal Secret (1942)
 Michael Strogoff (1944)
 The White Monk (1945)
 Twilight (1945)
 Everybody's Woman (1946)
 Flor de caña (1948)
 Desired (1951)
 Women Who Work (1953)
 The Last of the Fast Guns (1958)
 My Mother Is Guilty (1960)
 The Partisan of Villa (1967)
 Traitors of San Angel (1967)
 Farewell to Marriage (1968)

External links
 
 Alex Phillips, Builder of Atmospheres
 ASC Close-Up Henner Hofmann, ASC
 Medalla Salvador Toscano - ALEX PHILLIPS Jr.
 Biography at Canal 22 
 Histórico de nominados y ganadores - Ariel 
 ALEX PHILLIPS, CONSTRUCTOR DE ATMÓSFERAS 

1900 births
1977 deaths
Phillips, Alez 
Canadian emigrants to Mexico
Phillips, Alez 
Golden Ariel Award winners
Best Cinematography Ariel Award winners
Mexican people of Canadian descent